The Service, Office and Retail Workers’ Union of Canada was an independent feminist labour union based in Vancouver, British Columbia, Canada. It was organized and led by women workers, though any gender can and did become members. SORWUC organized across a number of industries, including bank employees, restaurant workers, and day care centres from 1972 to 1986.

References

Trade unions in British Columbia
1972 establishments in British Columbia
1986 disestablishments in British Columbia
Trade unions established in 1972
Trade unions disestablished in 1986
Women in Vancouver
Feminism in British Columbia
 SORWUC